Paraproto is a genus of marine amphipods in the family, Caprellidae, and was first described in 1903 by Paul Mayer. The type species is Paraproto condylata.

Species of this genus are found at depths of about 200 m in waters off New South Wales, South Australia, Tasmania, Victoria, and Antarctica.

Species
Species listed as accepted by IRMNG:
Paraproto condylata 
Paraproto gabrieli 
Paraproto spinosa 
Paraproto tasmaniensis

References

Taxa described in 1903
Corophiidea
Crustacean genera